Tian Yubao (born 24 December 1951) is a Chinese politician of Hui ethnicity. He was investigated by the Communist Party of China's anti-graft agency in November 2014. Previously he served as the Chairman of Taiyuan Municipal People's Congress.

Life
Tian was born and raised in Taiyuan, Shanxi, to an ethnic Hui family. It is not clear if he has a university degree.

In 1995 he became the party chief of Nanjiao District, a position he held until May 1997, when he was appointed the party chief of Xiaodian District. When he presided over party work in Xiaodian, Liu Suiji was district governor; when he left Xiaodian, Liu succeeded him as party chief there.

In 2002 he was transferred to a position in Taiyuan, capital of Shanxi province, and appointed the Vice-Chairman of Taiyuan Municipal People's Congress (futingji), where he was put in charge of legal work and led party-related work.

Tian Yubao retired in May 2012, and disappeared from public life.

Downfall
On November 3, 2014, it was announced that Tian would be investigated by the Shanxi Commission for Discipline Inspection for "serious violations of laws and regulations". He was detained by on December 11. After a quick investigation, Tian was expelled from the Communist Party on December 26. He was accused of taking large bribes and also purchasing stocks in a manner that violated regulations. His retirement benefits were also rescinded by the state, and his case was moved to judicial authorities for prosecution.

On June 16, 2016, he was sentenced to 13 years and fined 500,000 yuan for taking bribes and holding a huge amount of property without legal sources. All his illegal gains will be confiscated and handed over to the State.

References

1951 births
Chinese Communist Party politicians from Shanxi
Living people
Political office-holders in Shanxi
People's Republic of China politicians from Shanxi
Politicians from Taiyuan